Marasinganahalli is a small village in Maddur, Mandya, Karnataka state, India, with a population of around 1400. It used to be famous for its water, which was claimed to cure breathing problems.

References

Villages in Mandya district